Ettore Perego (11 April 1913 – 23 October 2013) was an Italian gymnast who competed at the 1948 Summer Olympics, where his best individual finish was 12th in the men's pommel horse while his team was ranked 5th among 16 nations in the men's team all-around. Born in Monza and competing out of Pro Lissone, he was an Italian national champion prior to the Games and later, until his 1978 retirement, worked as a gymnastics coach with Pro Lissone. He turned 100 in April 2013 and died in Sesto San Giovanni in October 2013.

References

1913 births
2013 deaths
Italian centenarians
Italian male artistic gymnasts
Olympic gymnasts of Italy
Gymnasts at the 1948 Summer Olympics
Men centenarians